Lucie Malchirand (born 21 February 2003) is a French professional golfer who plays on the Ladies European Tour. In 2021 she won the Ladies Italian Open as an 18 year old amateur.

Amateur career
Malchirand had a successful amateur career and reached number 10 in the World Amateur Golf Ranking. She won the Grand Prix de ligue PACA Dames in 2018 and 2020, the International Juniors of Belgium in 2018 and Internationaux de France U21 - Trophee Esmond in 2019.  She finished second in the 2020 Junior Orange Bowl in Florida. She was runner-up at the Portuguese International Ladies Amateur Championship in 2019 and won the event in 2021.

She represented France at the 2017 Toyota Junior Golf World Cup and at the European Girls' Team Championship three times. She played for Europe in the 2019 Junior Solheim Cup at Gleneagles and was part of the winning Junior Vagliano Trophy team in 2019.

Malchirand made her major debut at the 2020 U.S. Women's Open by virtue of being number 14 in the WAGR.

Professional career
Malchirand turned professional and joined the Ladies European Tour after she won the 2021 Ladies Italian Open. She won by one stroke following back-to-back birdies on the final two holes, after she received an invitation to the event having won the Portuguese International Ladies Amateur Championship two weeks earlier.

Amateur wins (6)
2018 Grand Prix de ligue PACA Dames, International Juniors of Belgium
2019 Internationaux de France U21 - Trophee Esmond
2020 Grand Prix de ligue PACA Dames, GTGA Invitational  
2021 Portuguese International Ladies Amateur Championship

Professional wins (1)

Ladies European Tour wins (1)

Team appearances
Amateur
European Girls' Team Championship (representing France): 2016, 2018, 2019
Toyota Junior Golf World Cup (representing France): 2017
Junior Vagliano Trophy (representing the Continent of Europe): 2019 (winners)
Junior Solheim Cup (representing Europe): 2019
European Ladies' Team Championship (representing France): 2020, 2021

References

External links

French female golfers
Ladies European Tour golfers
Sportspeople from Aix-en-Provence
2003 births
Living people
21st-century French women